Cainochoerinae was a subfamily of even-toed ungulates that existed during the Miocene and Pliocene in Asia and Africa.

Genera

†Albanohyus  Ginsburg, 1974 Miocene, Europe
†Cainochoerus Pickford, 1988 - Miocene - Pliocene, Africa

References

Miocene even-toed ungulates
Neogene mammals of Asia
Fossil taxa described in 1974
Pliocene even-toed ungulates
Prehistoric Suidae
Mammal subfamilies